Filip Vasiljević (born 5 October 2002) is a Serbian footballer who currently plays as a midfielder for Grafičar Beograd.

Career statistics

Club

Notes

References

2002 births
Living people
Serbian footballers
Association football midfielders
Serbian First League players
Red Star Belgrade footballers
RFK Grafičar Beograd players
Serbia under-21 international footballers